Sure Thing: The Jerome Kern Songbook is a 1994 album by André Previn  and Sylvia McNair of songs by the composer Jerome Kern.

Reception

The album was reviewed by Dave Nathan at Allmusic who wrote that aside from "There's no scatting or wordless singing and absolutely no risk-taking (except in the making of the album). Nevertheless, there are some very pleasant musical moments here, and on a couple of tunes McNair tries to inject some jazz feeling into her singing...Typically, Previn plays no-nonsense accompaniment for McNair, then takes a chorus or two in a jazz mode. There's no pretense here. McNair doesn't try to do jazz. Rather, she and her friends perform almost 70 minutes of very pleasant, straightforward music of one of the major contributors to the Great American Songbook ".

Track listing
All music by Jerome Kern, lyricists indicated

"Land Where the Good Songs Go" (PG Wodehouse) – 1:32
"I Won't Dance" (Dorothy Fields, Oscar Hammerstein II, Otto Harbach, Jimmy McHugh) – 3:09
"Nobody Else But Me" (Hammerstein) – 2:57
"The Folks Who Live On the Hill" (Hammerstein) – 5:57
"A Fine Romance" (Dorothy Fields) – 2:35
"Remind Me" (Fields) – 3:41
"You Couldn't Be Cuter" (Fields) – 2:53
"Why Was I Born?" (Hammerstein) – 3:59
"I'm Old Fashioned" (Johnny Mercer) – 3:40
"All The Things You Are" (Hammerstein) – 4:25
"Can't Help Singing"/"They Didn't Believe Me" (Yip Harburg)/(Herbert Reynolds) – 4:38
"Till The Clouds Roll By"/"Look for the Silver Lining" (Wodehouse)/(Buddy DeSylva) – 3:50
"Sure Thing"/"Long Ago (and Far Away)" (Ira Gershwin)/(Gershwin) – 5:32
"Can I Forget You"/"Smoke Gets In Your Eyes" (Hammerstein)/(Harbach) – 6:06
"Pick Yourself Up" (Fields) – 2:43
"The Song Is You" (Hammerstein) – 5:11
"Land Where The Good Songs Go (Reprise)" – 2:47
"Go Little Boat" (Wodehouse) – 3:36

Personnel
André Previn – piano
Sylvia McNair – vocals
David Finck – double bass

Production
George Cramer, Anthony Freud – art direction
John Newton – balance engineer
Henk Kooistra – editing, engineer
Max Harrison – liner notes
Bill Winn – mixing assistant
Christian Steiner – photography
Phil Ramone – producer

References

1994 albums
Albums produced by Phil Ramone
André Previn albums
Jerome Kern tribute albums
Philips Records albums
Sylvia McNair albums